The 2023 World Junior Ice Hockey Championship Division II were international ice hockey tournaments organized by the International Ice Hockey Federation. It consisted of two tiered groups of six teams each: the fourth-tier Division II A and the fifth-tier Division II B. For each tier's tournament, the team which will place first will be promoted to the next higher division, while the team which will place last will be relegated to a lower division.

To be eligible as a junior player in these tournaments, a player cannot be born earlier than 2003.

Division II A

The Division II A tournament was played in Kaunas, Lithuania, from 11 to 17 December 2022.

Participants

Match officials
Four referees and seven linesmen were selected for the tournament.

Referees
 Gergely Korbuly
 Krzysztof Kozłowski
 Māris Locāns
 Anton Peretyatko

Linesmen
 Go Hashimoto
 Alexander Kaptain
 Sergii Kharaberyush
 Vladislav Mashenkin
 Aleksej Sascenkov
 Jason Thorrignac
 Juri Timofejev

Final standings

Results
All times are local (UTC+2).

Statistics

Top 10 scorers

GP = Games played; G = Goals; A = Assists; Pts = Points; +/− = Plus-minus; PIM = Penalties In Minutes
Source: IIHF

Goaltending leaders
(minimum 40% team's total ice time)

TOI = Time on ice (minutes:seconds); GA = Goals against; GAA = Goals against average; Sv% = Save percentage; SO = Shutouts
Source: IIHF

Best Players Selected by the Directorate
 Goaltender:  Kazimieras Jukna
 Defenceman:  Jaime de Bonilla
 Forward:  Bruno Idžan

Source: IIHF

Division II B

The Division II B tournament was played in Reykjavík, Iceland, from 16 to 22 January 2023.

Participants

Final standings

Results
All times are local (UTC±0).

Statistics

Top 10 scorers

GP = Games played; G = Goals; A = Assists; Pts = Points; +/− = Plus-minus; PIM = Penalties In Minutes
Source: IIHF

Goaltending leaders
(minimum 40% team's total ice time)

TOI = Time on ice (minutes:seconds); GA = Goals against; GAA = Goals against average; Sv% = Save percentage; SO = Shutouts
Source: IIHF

Best Players Selected by the Directorate
 Goaltender:  Chen Shifeng
 Defenceman:  Lowie Vreys
 Forward:  Matija Dinić

Source: IIHF

References

External links
Division II A
Division II B

II
World Junior Ice Hockey Championships – Division II
World Junior Ice Hockey Championships
World Junior Ice Hockey Championships
World Junior Ice Hockey Championships
World Junior Ice Hockey Championships